Figueira de Castelo Rodrigo is a municipality in the District of Guarda in Portugal. The population in 2011 was 6,260, in an area of 508.57 km2.
Located in the Riba Coa (near the River Coa), just like other municipalities around Riba Coa, such as Almeida, Meda, Pinhel and Sabugal. Known for its castle which is a listed National monument, as well as pine-wood forests and rolling hills.

The municipality borders the frontier with Spain, formed by the Águeda River, a tributary of the Douro, which it joins at Barca D'Alva, approximately 18 km north of Figueira de Castelo Rodrigo town.

The present Mayor is Carlos Condesso, elected by the Social Democratic Party. The municipal holiday is July 7.

Figueira de Castelo Rodrigo figures in José Saramago's 2008 novel The Elephant's Journey.

Climate
Figueira de Castelo Rodrigo has a Mediterranean climate with cool, wet winters and hot, dry summers. Temperatures can easily surpass  in the summer and go below  in the winter. It is one of the coldest towns in Portugal in the winter.

Parishes
   
Administratively, the municipality is divided into 10 civil parishes (freguesias):
 Algodres, Vale de Alfonsinho e Vilar de Amargo
 Almofala e Escarigo
 Castelo Rodrigo
 Cinco Vilas e Reigada
 Colmeal e Vilar Torpim
 Escalhão
 Figueira de Castelo Rodrigo
 Freixeda do Torrão, Quintã de Pêro Martins e Penha da Águia
 Mata de Lobos
 Vermiosa

Notable people 
 João Pedro (born 1986) a retired professional footballer with over 470 club caps

See also
Castelo Rodrigo IPR
Castelo Rodrigo Castle

References

External links
Municipality official website

 
Municipalities of Guarda District
Towns in Portugal